Bimal Comar Ghosh (1906-1961) was an Indian politician. He was elected to the Lok Sabha, the lower house of the Parliament of India, from Barrackpore, West Bengal as a member of the Praja Socialist Party.

References

External links
Official Biographical Sketch in Lok Sabha Website

Praja Socialist Party politicians
Lok Sabha members from West Bengal
Rajya Sabha members from West Bengal
India MPs 1957–1962
1906 births
1961 deaths
Indian National Congress politicians from West Bengal